The Sierra del Lacandón is a low karstic mountain range in Guatemala and Mexico. It is situated in the north-west of the department of El Petén and the south-east of Chiapas. Its highest points are located near the Mexican border at coordinates
 and 
The range consists of southeast to northwest trending ridges of folded Cretaceous limestone and dolomite hills rising above the lowlands of the Petén Basin.

Sierra del Lacandón National Park

The Sierra del Lacandón National Park is a  national park established in 1990. It is part of the Maya Biosphere Reserve and is unique for its biodiversity. It is also considered of great importance for the Mesoamerican Biological Corridor as it connects the protected areas of northern Guatemala with those of southern Mexico, like the Montes Azules Biosphere Reserve in Chiapas.

Several ancient Maya archaeological sites are located within the park boundaries. These include Piedras Negras, El Porvenir, Macabilero, La Pasadita, El Hormiguero, and El Ceibo.

See also
Geography of Guatemala

References

External links
 Parkswatch.org
 Decreto 5-90

Lacandon
Lacandon
Lacandon
Protected areas established in 1990
Geography of Mesoamerica
Landforms of Chiapas
Usumacinta River
Petén–Veracruz moist forests